Ola is the third studio album released by Swedish pop singer Ola.

The self-titled studio album Ola was released in Sweden in September 2010, and debuted at number three on the Swedish Albums Chart. It is the first release on Ola's own label Oliniho Records, after buying himself out of his deal with Universal Music.  It spawned three hit singles, "Unstoppable", "Overdrive" and "All Over The World", which was Ola's first international single release. The similarity between "All Over The World" and "Somebody To Love" by Justin Bieber is often noted, but believed to be coincidence, as the two were released at the same time.

The album also contained the bonus track "Let It Hit You", composed by Ola with regular collaborator Alexander Kronlund and British artist Labrinth.

Track listing
"All Over the World" (3:53)
"Unstoppable (The Return of Natalie)" (3:01)
"You're That Girl (YTG)" 3:23)
"Riot" (3:22)
"Overdrive" (3:39)
"Beautiful Rain" (3:49)
"Busy Doing Nothing" (3:40)
"Still Remember" (3:45)
"Let It Hit You" (3:36)
"Twisted Memories" (4:34)

Charts

References

Ola Svensson albums
2010 albums
Albums produced by Labrinth